Philadelphian is most commonly used to describe someone who is from (or a resident of) the city of Philadelphia, Pennsylvania.

 List of people from Philadelphia

"Philadelphian" may also refer to:

 Old Philadelphians, members of the First Families of Philadelphia considered part of the historic core of the East Coast establishment
 Philadelphians, a 17th-century Protestant religious sect (sometimes called the "Philadelphian Society", or the "Philadelphia Society")
 Philadelphian cricket team, a first-class cricket team from the turn of the 20th century
 a train operated by Amtrak as part of the Clocker service

See also 

 Philadelphion, a public square located in Constantinople
 Philadelphia (disambiguation)
 Phillies (disambiguation)
 Philly (disambiguation)